Hund (meaning dog) is a Germanic surname that may refer to the following notable people:
Barbara Hund (born 1959), German-Swiss chess grandmaster, daughter of Juliane and Gerhard
Friedrich Hund (1896–1997), German physicist 
Gerhard Hund (born 1932), German physicist and chess player, son of Friedrich, husband of Juliane
Isabel Hund (born 1962), German chess player, daughter of Juliane and Gerhard, sister of Barbara
Juliane Hund (1928-1999), German chess player
Karl Gotthelf von Hund (1722–1776), German freemason 
Thorir Hund (born ca. 990), one of the greatest chiefs in Hålogaland, Norway

German-language surnames